Brianne Michelle Folds (born January 25, 1998) is an American professional soccer player who plays as a midfielder for Spanish club Real Betis.

Youth and college
At youth level, Folds scored 173 goals with 155 assists in 4 years at Lakeland Christian High School, while she also won the US Youth National Championship with Tampa Bay Chargers.

Folds signed for Auburn University, where she scored 24 goals and registered 25 assists in 79 matches.  During her time at Auburn, Folds represented the United States at U23 level, most recently in April 2019.

Club career
After graduating college in December 2019, Folds was drafted by North Carolina Courage in the 2020 NWSL College Draft. She was selected 36th overall, in the fourth round.

In June 2020, Folds signed an 18-month contract with Swedish runners-up Kopparbergs/Göteborg FC after training with the team.

References

External links
 Auburn Tigers bio
 

Living people
1998 births
American women's soccer players
Soccer players from Florida
Sportspeople from Lakeland, Florida
Women's association football midfielders
Auburn Tigers women's soccer players
North Carolina Courage draft picks
BK Häcken FF players
Damallsvenskan players
American expatriate women's soccer players
Expatriate women's footballers in Sweden
American expatriate sportspeople in Sweden